Gamasellus shcherbakae is a species of mite in the family Ologamasidae.

References

shcherbakae
Articles created by Qbugbot
Animals described in 1982